A Thursday is a 2022 Indian Hindi-language vigilante thriller film written and directed by Behzad Khambata. The film was produced by RSVP Movies and stars Yami Gautam, Atul Kulkarni, Neha Dhupia, Dimple Kapadia and Karanvir Sharma. The film premiered on Disney+ Hotstar on 17 February 2022.

Plot 
Naina Jaiswal is a teacher at the Little Dots play school in Colaba. She was on leave for three weeks for some unknown reason. We learn that the school is located in the front portion of the property owned by Rohit Mirchandani, Naina’s fiance. Rohit also lives on the same property. The parents come to drop off their kids, and Naina requests one of the parents to send a cake, as she remembered that it was their daughter, Niharika’s, birthday the next day. She asked if their driver could deliver the cake to the school. Everybody leaves the premises, and something snaps inside Naina. There is a devilish fervor inside her that is ready to burn anything and everything that comes her way. She calls the Colaba police station and informs them that she has 16 children as hostages.Just then, Niharika’s driver arrives with a cake. Savitri, the helper, also, unfortunately, returns to take her phone, which she had forgotten. Both of them are taken into captivity as Naina has no other option.

The police officials came to see if the call received was a prank or if something was actually happening. Naina fires a shot to let the authorities know that she means business. Catherine Alvarez, the ACP, gets in touch with her, and Naina makes an unusual demand that she will only negotiate with an officer named Javed Khan. Naina initiates her death game, and Javed Khan is brought to the scene. She tells Javed that she will free one child for every demand met. The first demand she makes is that she wants five crore rupees transferred into her account. Catherine Alvarez and Javed Khan had a history together, so they were not very compatible while working together. Catherine does not listen to Javed and tries to send armed police inside. It results in Naina killing Aakash, one of the children, and the first name in alphabetical order as Naina had previously stated. The commissioner of police gives complete charge to Javed and sends Catherine to do the background research as both of them had major disagreements that were not helping the current situation.

Naina’s second demand is that she wants to talk to the Prime Minister. Unable to find a solution, the forces give in to the demand. The Prime Minister, Maya Rajguru, talks to Naina on the phone, and the latter urges her to come in person and meet her.
Naina tells Javed Khan to find two guys, Rakesh Mathur and Charan Kumar, who she last knew were working at BWC school in Goregaon, and bring them to her. The police are able to locate Rakesh Mathur, but they cannot find Charan Kumar. No one knows what Naina is up to, and Javed Khan and his team have no choice but to agree to what she says because the children are still in her custody.
Catherine discovers, while conducting a background check, that Naina has been taking antidepressants and visiting a psychologist since she was 16 years old. She searches Naina’s house and finds receipts for the medicine prescribed by Dr. Juneja. She gets in touch with Dr. Juneja, while Javed Khan gets hold of Naina’s mother. The information that they get from both of them makes the picture a bit clearer. Naina had been raped when she was 16 years old. Javed Khan and Catherine were the officers in charge of the case. They both paid little attention to Naina’s case as they were chasing a high-profile case to get into the limelight. Naina’s mother begged them for a couple of years and then started living with the trauma as there was no one who would address her grievances.

Prime Minister Maya Rajguru decides to meet Naina in person. She is accompanied only by Javed Khan. Naina brings up the POCSO Act, which came into effect in the year 2012. It was enacted in order to protect children under 18 years of age against sexual offenses. Naina asks the Prime Minister why there isn’t anything for people over 18. She demands that the Prime Minister assure her right then and there that rape offenders will face the death penalty. The PM tells Naina that amending the rules or passing an act is a complex task that requires time, but also assures her that she will make sure that her rapists are found and put behind bars. Naina then reveals that the kid she 'killed' is actually alive and she faked the death.

For some reason, the police were not able to find Charan Kumar. Naina then reveals that Charan Kumar is the same person who had brought Niharika’s birthday cake and was working as a driver for the family. He would always hold Niharika's hand which worried Naina that he could rape Niharika too so Naina comes up with a ploy. She asks Niharika’s mother to send her driver with the cake, He was the one who had raped her while Rakesh Mathur held her hands. Naina shoots Charan Kumar and takes her revenge.The commandos enter the house and take Naina into custody. While Naina is being transported to prison, Maya Rajguru brings up the issue of capital punishment in parliament. A few months later, while teaching a class in prison, Naina picks up a newspaper, sees the headline, and smiles.

Cast 
 Yami Gautam as Naina Jaiswal
 Atul Kulkarni as Javed Khan
 Neha Dhupia as ACP Catherine "Cathy" Alvarez
 Dimple Kapadia as Prime Minister Maya Rajguru
 Karanvir Sharma as Rohit Mirchandani, Naina's fiance
 Maya Sarao as Shalini Guha, Naina's student Yash's mother
 Sukesh Anand as Lokhande
 Kalyanee Mulay as Savitri, Naina's maid
 Boloram Das as Charan Kumar, Naina's rapist and Niharika's family driver
 Shubhangi Latkar as Kusum Jaiswal, Naina's mother
 Adi Irani as Police Commissioner
 Divjyot Kaur as Renuka Dubey
 Micky Makhija as Rohit's father
 Sanjeev Jotangia as Malcolm
 Sulagna Chatterjee as Aakash's mom
 Bhavin Hirani as Aakash's dad
 Raj Kumar sharma as Home Minister
 Asim Sharma as PM PR REP
 Hardika Sharma as Niharika (play school student)

Production  
The principal photography began on 12 March 2021 and wrapped up in July 2021.

Reception 
Cyril of India Today gave the film a rating of 4/5 and wrote "Yami Gautam's A Thursday is the kind of thriller that has been missing from Indian screens for a while". Renuka Vyavahare of The Times Of India gave the film a rating of 3/5 and wrote "Despite a rather predictable backstory, A Thursday redeems itself with its powerful emotional arc and social commentary in the latter half. It touches upon a relevant issue that will resonate with women across the globe".

Pradeep Menon of Firstpost gave the film a rating of 2.75/5 and wrote "A Thursday strives to be urgent, relevant and cool, but succeeds only partially, because it stops to make a point far too often". Shubham Kulkarni of Koimoi gave the film a rating of 2.5/5 and wrote "A Thursday is a Yami Gautam show and she does bring her A-game on. But the set up ditches her a bit". Shubhra Gupta of Indian Express gave the film a rating of 1.5/5 and wrote "The chief problem with Yami Gautam film is that we do not take any of this seriously, whether it is Naina brandishing a gun, or snarling and cooing at her hostages.

Soundtrack 

The soundtrack to A Thursday featured twenty one instrumental compositions used in the film score curated and composed by Rooshin Dalal and Kaizad Gherda.

References

External links 
 

Indian thriller drama films
Indian action thriller films
2022 films
2020s Hindi-language films
2020 thriller drama films
Disney+ Hotstar original films